The  was an early class of submarines of the Imperial Japanese Navy.

Background
These kits were assembled at the Kure Naval Arsenal.

Design
Physically almost identical to the Ha-1 class, the three vessels assembled in Japan incorporated a number of improvements, including extended bow for improved seaworthiness, improved rudder for surface handling, and an increase in the size of the bridge and conning tower.

Ships in class
, laid down 1 August 1910; launched 5 March 1911; commissioned 12 August 1911 as Submersible No.10; reclassified as 2nd class submersible on 4 August 1916, reclassified as 3rd class submarine on 1 April 1919; renamed Ha-3 on 15 June 1923, decommissioned on 1 December 1929.
, laid down 1 August 1910; launched 13 March 1911; commissioned 26 August 1911 as Submersible No.11; reclassified as 2nd class submersible on 4 August 1916, reclassified as 3rd class submarine on 1 April 1919; renamed Ha-4 on 15 June 1923; decommissioned on 1 December 1929.
, laid down 1 August 1910; launched 27 March 1911; commissioned 3 August 1911 as Submersible No.12; reclassified as 2nd class submersible on 4 August 1916, reclassified as 3rd class submarine on 1 April 1919; renamed Ha-5 on 15 June 1923; decommissioned on 1 December 1929.

Notes

References

External links

Submarine classes
Submarines of the Imperial Japanese Navy
Ships built in Barrow-in-Furness
1911 ships